In the United States, the presidential library system is a nationwide network of 15 libraries administered by the Office of Presidential Libraries, which is part of the National Archives and Records Administration (NARA). These are repositories for preserving and making available the papers, records, collections and other historical materials of every president of the United States from Herbert Hoover (31st president, 1929–1933) to Barack Obama (44th president, 2009–2017). In addition to the library services, museum exhibitions concerning the presidency are displayed.

Although recognized as having historical significance, before the mid-20th century presidential papers and effects were generally understood to be the private property of the president. Franklin D. Roosevelt (32nd president, 1933–1945) proposed to leave his papers to the public in a building donated by him on his Hyde Park estate.  Since then a series of laws established the public keeping of documents and the presidential library system. While not officially sanctioned and maintained by NARA, libraries have also been organized for several presidents who preceded Hoover and the official start of the Presidential Library Office.

The library sites are sometimes referred to as presidential centers. The Barack Obama Presidential Center (44th president, 2009–2017) is currently the most recent library to operate under a new model, whereby the Barack Obama Presidential Library is fully digitized, preserved, and administered by NARA with archival materials lent to the privately operated Presidential Center for display.

Overview

For every president since Herbert Hoover, presidential libraries have been established in each president's home state in which documents, artifacts, gifts of state and museum exhibits are maintained that relate to the former president's life and career both political and professional. Each library also provides an active series of public programs. When a president leaves office, the National Archives and Records Administration (NARA) establishes a presidential materials project to house and index the documents until a new presidential library is built and transferred to the federal government.

The first presidential library is the Franklin D. Roosevelt Presidential Library and Museum, dedicated on June 30, 1941. The George W. Bush Presidential Center became the thirteenth on May 1, 2013.

Presidential libraries outside NARA
The presidential library system is made up of thirteen presidential libraries operated by the NARA. Libraries and museums have been established for earlier presidents, but they are not part of the NARA presidential library system, and are operated by private foundations, historical societies, or state governments, including the James K. Polk, William McKinley, Rutherford B. Hayes, Calvin Coolidge, Abraham Lincoln and Woodrow Wilson libraries. For example, the Abraham Lincoln Presidential Library and Museum is owned and operated by the state of Illinois.

The Richard Nixon Library and Birthplace was not originally part of the presidential library system. While the Nixon Presidential Materials Staff, which administers the Nixon presidential materials under the terms of the Presidential Recordings and Materials Preservation Act, is part of NARA, a private foundation operated the Richard Nixon Library & Birthplace. In January 2004, Congress passed legislation that provided for the establishment of a federally operated Richard Nixon Presidential Library in Yorba Linda, California. In March 2005, the Archivist of the United States and John Taylor, the director of the Richard Nixon Library & Birthplace Foundation, exchanged letters on the requirements to allow the Nixon Library to become the twelfth federally funded presidential library operated by the NARA by 2007. On October 16, 2006, Dr. Timothy Naftali began his tenure as the first federal director of the Richard Nixon Library and Birthplace, and in the winter of 2006 NARA began to transfer the 30,000 presidential gifts from the Nixon Presidential Materials Staff in College Park, Maryland to the facility. On July 11, 2007, the Nixon Foundation deeded the Library and Birthplace to the government of the United States. On the same day, the newly renamed federal Richard Nixon Presidential Library and Museum officially opened.

In May 2012, on the fiftieth anniversary of the founding of the Ulysses S. Grant Foundation, it selected Mississippi State University as the permanent location for Ulysses S. Grant's presidential library.  Historian John Simon edited Grant's letters into a 32-volume scholarly edition published by Southern Illinois University Press.

On April 30, 2013, both chambers of the North Dakota Legislative Assembly passed a bill appropriating $12 million to Dickinson State University to award a grant to the Theodore Roosevelt Center for construction of a building to be named the Theodore Roosevelt Presidential Library. To access these funds, the Theodore Roosevelt Center must first raise $3 million from non-state sources. Dickinson State University is also home to the Theodore Roosevelt Digital Library which has formed partnerships with the Library of Congress and Harvard University, among other institutions. They currently have over 25,000 items online.

On April 12, 2016, Harding 2020, a collaboration between the Harding Home, Ohio History Connection, and Marion Technical College, detailed plans to spend $7.3 million to establish the Warren G. Harding Presidential Center. Plans include restoring the Harding Home, Warren G. Harding's historic home in Marion, Ohio, and its grounds to its 1920 appearance. A 15,000-square-foot presidential center and museum will also be built adjacent to the house. Harding's presidential papers will then be moved from its current location at the Ohio History Connection's headquarters in Columbus, Ohio to the new center. The culmination of the work, scheduled to be completed by the spring of 2020, is to coincide with the 100th anniversary of Harding's election to the presidency.

In May 2017, it was announced that the Barack Obama Presidential Center, the planned location of the presidential library of Barack Obama, would not be part of the NARA system, making Obama the first president since Calvin Coolidge not to have a federally funded facility.  Instead, in a "new model" the nonprofit Obama Foundation will partner with the NARA on digitization and making documents available. The Chicago Park District began related construction in August and suspended it in September 2018. It was announced that the city of Chicago would own the Center.

History
Historically, all presidential papers were considered the personal property of the president. Some took them at the end of their terms, others destroyed them, and many papers were scattered. Though many pre-Hoover collections now reside in the Manuscript Division of the Library of Congress, others are split among other libraries, historical societies, and private collections. However, many materials have been lost or deliberately destroyed.

Lucretia Rudolph Garfield, the wife of James A. Garfield (president from March 4, 1881, until his death on September 19, 1881) added a Memorial Library wing to their family home in Mentor, Ohio, four years after his assassination. The James A. Garfield National Historic Site is operated by the National Park Service and the Western Reserve Historical Society.

National Archives
In 1939, President Franklin Delano Roosevelt donated his personal and presidential papers to the federal government. At the same time, Roosevelt pledged part of his estate at Hyde Park, New York to the United States, and friends of the president formed a non-profit corporation to raise funds for the construction of the library and museum building. Roosevelt's decision stemmed from his belief that presidential papers were an important part of the national heritage and should be accessible to the public. He asked the National Archives to take custody of his papers and other historical materials and to administer his library. On June 30, 2013, new interactive and multimedia exhibits developed by the National Archives and Records Administration (NARA) opened to the public as part of the first renovation of this library since its opening.

In 1950, Harry S. Truman decided that he, too, would build a library to house his presidential papers and helped to galvanize congressional action.

Presidential Libraries Act of 1955
In 1955, Congress passed the Presidential Libraries Act of 1955, establishing a system of privately erected and federally maintained libraries. The Act encouraged other presidents to donate their historical materials to the government and ensured the preservation of presidential papers and their availability to the people of the United States. Under this and subsequent acts, nine more libraries have been established. In each case, private and non-federal public sources provided the funds to build the library. Once completed, the private organization turned over the libraries to the National Archives and Records Administration to operate and maintain.

Until 1978, presidents, scholars, and legal professionals held the view dating back to George Washington that the records created by the president or his staff while in office remained the personal property of the president and were his to take with him when he left office. The first presidential libraries were built on this concept. NARA successfully persuaded presidents to donate their historical materials to the federal government for housing in a presidential library managed by NARA.

Presidential Records Act of 1978
The Presidential Records Act of 1978 established that the presidential records that document the constitutional, statutory, and ceremonial duties of the president are the property of the United States Government. After the president leaves office, the Archivist of the United States assumes custody of the records. The Act allowed for the continuation of presidential libraries as the repository for presidential records.

Presidential Libraries Act of 1986
The  made additional changes to presidential libraries, requiring private endowments linked to the size of the facility. NARA uses these endowments to offset a portion of the maintenance costs for the library.

Presidential Historical Records Preservation Act of 2008
The  amended  to authorize grants for Presidential Centers of Historical Excellence.

Holdings
The thirteen presidential libraries maintain over 400 million pages of textual materials; nearly ten million photographs; over 15 million feet (5,000 km) of motion picture film; nearly 100,000 hours of disc, audiotape, and videotape recordings; and approximately half a million museum objects. These varied holdings make each library a valuable source of information and a center for research on the Presidency.

The most important textual materials in each library are those created by the president and his staff in the course of performing the official duties. Libraries also house numerous objects including family heirlooms, items collected by the president and his family, campaign memorabilia, awards, and the many gifts given to the president by American citizens and foreign dignitaries. These gifts range in type from homemade items to valuable works of art. Curators in presidential libraries and in other museums throughout the country draw upon these collections for historical exhibits.

Other significant holdings include the personal papers and historical materials donated by individuals associated with the president. These individuals may include Cabinet officials, envoys to foreign governments, political party associates, and the president's family and personal friends. Several libraries have undertaken oral history programs that have produced tape-recorded memoirs. A third body of materials comprises the papers accumulated by the president prior to, and following, his presidency. Such collections include documents relating to Theodore Roosevelt's tenure as Governor of New York and Dwight D. Eisenhower's long military career.

With the exception of John F. Kennedy, Lyndon B. Johnson, and (upon his own death) Jimmy Carter, every American president since Hoover is or has chosen to be buried at their presidential library. Kennedy is buried at Arlington National Cemetery; Johnson is buried at his ranch in the hill country of Texas, west of Austin; Carter plans to be buried near his home in Plains, Georgia. Bill Clinton will be buried at the William Jefferson Clinton Presidential Center in Little Rock. George W. Bush will be buried at the George W. Bush Presidential Center in Dallas. The future burial sites of 44th president Barack Obama, 45th president Donald Trump, and 46th president Joe Biden are still unknown.

Unlike all other presidents whose libraries are part of the NARA system, Ford's library and museum are geographically separate buildings, located in different parts of Michigan; Ford is buried at his museum in Grand Rapids, while the library is in Ann Arbor.

List of presidential libraries
This is a list of the presidential libraries.

Locations of other presidents' papers
Grover Cleveland and Woodrow Wilson left their papers to Princeton University where they may be found at the Seeley G. Mudd Manuscript Library. The Theodore Roosevelt Association collected Theodore Roosevelt's papers and donated them to Harvard University in 1943, where they reside at its Widener and Houghton libraries.

James Buchanan left his papers to the Historical Society of Pennsylvania in Philadelphia, where they may still be found. The Papers of Andrew Jackson is a project sponsored by the University of Tennessee at Knoxville to collect Andrew Jackson's papers on microfilm. A microfilm edition of Martin Van Buren's papers was produced at Pennsylvania State University in 1987; a digital edition of the Papers of Martin Van Buren is being produced at Cumberland University. A similar project is underway on behalf of James Madison by the Universities of Virginia and Chicago.

For many presidents, especially before the development of the NARA system, substantial collections may be found in multiple private and public collections. Until the Obama Administration's library is ready for service, its papers are being held in a facility in Hoffman Estates, Illinois, and are not available to the public as they are classified.

See also
 United States presidential memorials
 
 First Ladies National Historic Site
 Jefferson Davis Presidential Library and Museum
 Gladstone's Library
 Churchill Archives Centre
 National Churchill Museum
 Vicente Fox Center of Studies, Library and Museum
 Quayle Vice Presidential Learning Center
 Olusegun Obasanjo Presidential Library
 World's Smallest Presidential Library (David Rice Atchison)
 Perdana Leadership Foundation

Notes

References

 Portions of this article based on public domain text from the National Archives and Records Administration

National Archives and Records Administration
 

Libraries